Byblis may refer to:

 Byblis, daughter of Miletus and Tragasia in Greek mythology
 Byblis (plant), a genus of carnivorous plants
 Byblis (amphipod), a genus of amphipods
 The asteroid 199 Byblis
 Biblis, a town in Germany

Genus disambiguation pages